Sumpter Township may refer to:

 Sumpter Township, Bradley County, Arkansas, in Bradley County, Arkansas
 Sumpter Township, Cumberland County, Illinois
 Sumpter Township, Wayne County, Michigan

Township name disambiguation pages